James Addison Cravens (November 4, 1818 – June 20, 1893) was a nineteenth-century politician and military veteran from Indiana who served two terms in the United States House of Representatives from 1861 to 1865. He was the second cousin of James Harrison Cravens.

Biography
Born in Rockingham County, Virginia, Cravens moved near Hardinsburg, Indiana with his father in 1820 where he attended public schools as a child. He engaged in agricultural pursuits and livestock raising.

Mexican-American War
served in the Mexican–American War as Major (United States) of the 2nd Indiana Volunteer Regiment from 1846 to 1847 and was a member of the Indiana House of Representatives in 1848 and 1849. Cravens served in the Indiana Senate from 1850 to 1853, was commissioned a brigadier general in the Indiana Militia in 1854.

Political career 
He was elected a Democrat to the United States House of Representatives in 1860, serving from 1861 to 1865, not being a candidate for renomination in 1864. During the lame-duck session of the 38th Congress, he voted against the Thirteenth Amendment abolishing slavery.

He was a delegate to the National Union Convention in 1866 and to the Democratic National Convention in 1868.

Later career and death 
He resumed agricultural pursuits until his death in Hardinsburg, Indiana on June 20, 1893. He was interred in Hardin Cemetery in Hardinsburg.

External links
 Retrieved on 2009-03-18

1818 births
1893 deaths
Democratic Party members of the Indiana House of Representatives
Democratic Party Indiana state senators
United States Army officers
People from Rockingham County, Virginia
American military personnel of the Mexican–American War
People of Indiana in the American Civil War
People from Indiana in the Mexican–American War
People from Washington County, Indiana
Democratic Party members of the United States House of Representatives from Indiana
19th-century American politicians